Kachchi Sadak is a 2006 Bollywood film directed by Sanjay D Singh. The film stars Rahul Singh, Parmita Katkar, Madhoo, Mukesh Tiwari, Amrish Puri, Rahul Dev and Mithun Chakraborty in a Special appearance.

Kachchi Sadak is a slew of masala movies released with rapid succession in the 1970s and 1980s. An ordinary story line of revenge and vengeance with loads of blasts and explosions.

Cast
 Rahul Singh...... Randhir
 Parmita Katkar...... Julie
 Amrish Puri (in his last film appearance until his death) 
 Madhoo
 Rahul Dev
 Mukesh Tiwari
 Aman Verma
 Sharat Saxena
 Govind Namdeo
 Tinu Anand
 Reema Lagoo
 Narendra Jha
 Anant Jog
 Bharat Bhushan
 Jay Soni
 Palak Jain
 Mithun Chakraborty

References

External links
 

2006 films
2000s Hindi-language films